The English Institute of Sport (EIS), established in May 2002, is an organisation which provides sport science and medical support services to elite athletes through a nationwide network of expertise and facilities, working with Olympic and Paralympic summer and winter sports, as well as English and a number of professional sports.

It is headquartered in Manchester, with regional centers in Bath, Bisham Abbey, Loughborough, London, and Sheffield.

The EIS also works with a range of other sports organisations, including national governing bodies of sport, professional sports teams, and individual athletes.

Structure
A grant funded organisation through UK Sport, Olympic and Paralympic sports are able to engage with EIS services through their Programme funding from UK Sport, English sports through their Sport England funding and professional sports through their respective funding bodies.

Centres
Services are delivered from nine EIS High Performance Centres across the country, as well as at a number of additional partner sites.

See also
 United Kingdom Sports Institute
 Sport in England
 UK Sport
 Scottish Institute of Sport
 Sport Wales National Centre
 Sports Institute for Northern Ireland

References

2002 establishments in England
Department for Digital, Culture, Media and Sport
Loughborough Sport
Organisations based in Manchester
National Institutes of Sport
Private companies limited by guarantee of the United Kingdom
Sport in Manchester
Sports medicine in the United Kingdom
England
Sports organizations established in 2002